Jean-Marie Périer (born 1 February 1940) is a French photographer and film director.

On 22 June 1963, the magazine Salut les copains organised a concert on Place de la Nation in Paris, with singers such as Johnny Hallyday, Richard Anthony, Eddy Mitchell and Frank Alamo. It attracted over 150,000 young people and raised their spirits, with the following day's issue of the journal Paris-Presse having the headline "Salut les voyous!" The photographer and friend of many singers who photographed the concert was Jean-Marie Périer.

Filmography
 1970 : Tumuc Humac, a film taking place in the Tumuk Humak Mountains, with Marc Porel, Dani, François Périer and André Pousse
 1973 : , with Jacques Dutronc and Keith Carradine as John
 1973 : Témoignages (TV series) (episode : Un monstre), with François Périer
 1978 : Dirty Dreamer, with Jacques Dutronc and Lea Massari
 1980 : Téléphone public (screened out of competition at the 1980 Cannes Film Festival)
 1985 : Love & Happiness, David Sanborn live with Marcus Miller, Don Grolnick, Hiram Bullock, Buddy Williams and Hamish Stuart.
 2007 :  Catching Salinger, a documentary featuring writer Frederic Beigbeder.

Exhibitions 
 2022 : Jean-Marie Périer. El fotógrafo de las estrellas, Málaga, Centro Cultural La Malagueta Galerie Photo12
 2014 : Rolling Stones revealed, Paris, Galerie Photo12
 2013 : Rock'n Roll, Paris, Galerie Polka
 2013 : Pour ceux qui aiment le Jazz, Paris, Galerie Photo12
 2011 : Françoise, Paris, Galerie Photo12
 2010 : Sixties, Mégève, Galerie Pierre Mahaux
 2010 : Fashion, Los Angeles, Galerie Polka
 2009 : Scopitone, les années de légende, Paris, Galerie Photo12

References

External links
 Official website 

1940 births
Living people
French photographers
French film directors
Paris Match writers
Commandeurs of the Ordre des Arts et des Lettres
People from Neuilly-sur-Seine